Egypt, officially the Arab Republic of Egypt, is a transcontinental country spanning the northeast corner of Africa and southwest corner of Asia via a land bridge formed by the Sinai Peninsula. It is bordered by the Mediterranean Sea to the north, the Gaza Strip of Palestine and Israel to the northeast, the Red Sea to the east, Sudan to the south, and Libya to the west. The Gulf of Aqaba in the northeast separates Egypt from Jordan and Saudi Arabia. Cairo is the capital and largest city of Egypt, while Alexandria, the second-largest city, is an important industrial and tourist hub at the Mediterranean coast. At approximately 100 million inhabitants, Egypt is the 14th-most populated country in the world.

Egypt has one of the longest histories of any country, tracing its heritage along the Nile Delta back to the 6th–4th millennia BCE. Considered a cradle of civilisation, Ancient Egypt saw some of the earliest developments of writing, agriculture, urbanisation, organised religion and central government. Iconic monuments such as the Giza Necropolis and its Great Sphinx, as well the ruins of Memphis, Thebes, Karnak, and the Valley of the Kings, reflect this legacy and remain a significant focus of scientific and popular interest. Egypt's long and rich cultural heritage is an integral part of its national identity, which reflects its unique transcontinental location being simultaneously Mediterranean, Middle Eastern and North African. Egypt was an early and important centre of Christianity, but was largely Islamised in the seventh century and remains a predominantly Sunni Muslim country, albeit with a significant Christian minority, along with other lesser practiced faiths.

Modern Egypt dates back to 1922, when it gained independence from the British Empire as a monarchy. Following the 1952 revolution, Egypt declared itself a republic, and in 1958 it merged with Syria to form the United Arab Republic, which dissolved in 1961. Throughout the second half of the 20th century, Egypt endured social and religious strife and political instability, fighting several armed conflicts with Israel in 1948, 1956, 1967 and 1973, and occupying the Gaza Strip intermittently until 1967. In 1978, Egypt signed the Camp David Accords, officially withdrawing from the Gaza Strip and recognising Israel. After the Arab Spring, which led to the 2011 Egyptian revolution and overthrow of Hosni Mubarak, the country faced a protracted period of political unrest. Egypt's current government, a semi-presidential republic led by Abdel Fattah el-Sisi since 2014, has been described by a number of watchdogs as authoritarian and responsible for perpetuating the country's poor human rights record.

Islam is the official religion of Egypt and Arabic is its official language. With over 100 million inhabitants, Egypt is the most populous country in North Africa, the Middle East, and the Arab world, the third-most populous in Africa (after Nigeria and Ethiopia), and the fourteenth-most populous in the world. The large regions of the Sahara desert, which constitute most of Egypt's territory, are sparsely inhabited. About 43% of Egypt's residents live across the country's urban areas, with most spread across the densely populated centres of greater Cairo, Alexandria and other major cities in the Nile Delta.

Egypt is considered to be a regional power in North Africa, the Middle East and the Muslim world, and a middle power worldwide. It is a developing country, ranking 97th on the Human Development Index. It has a diversified economy, which is the third-largest in Africa, the 33rd-largest economy by nominal GDP, and the 20th-largest globally by PPP. Egypt is a founding member of the United Nations, the Non-Aligned Movement, the Arab League, the African Union, Organisation of Islamic Cooperation and the World Youth Forum.

Names

The English name "Egypt" is derived from the Ancient Greek "" (""), via Middle French "Egypte" and Latin "". It is reflected in early Greek Linear B tablets as "a-ku-pi-ti-yo". The adjective "aigýpti-"/"aigýptios" was borrowed into Coptic as "", and from there into Arabic as "", back formed into "" (""), whence English "Copt". The Greek forms were borrowed from Late Egyptian (Amarna) Hikuptah or "Memphis", a corruption of the earlier Egyptian name O6-t:pr-D28-Z1-p:t-H ( 𓉗 𓏏𓉐𓂓𓏤𓊪 𓏏 𓎛), meaning "home of the ka (soul) of Ptah", the name of a temple to the god Ptah at Memphis.

"" ("") is the Classical Quranic Arabic and modern official name of Egypt, while "" is the local pronunciation in Egyptian Arabic. The name is of Semitic origin, directly cognate with other Semitic words for Egypt such as the Hebrew "" (""). The oldest attestation of this name for Egypt is the Akkadian "mi-iṣ-ru" ("miṣru") related to miṣru/miṣirru/miṣaru, meaning "border" or "frontier". The Neo-Assyrian Empire used the derived term , Mu-ṣur.

The ancient Egyptian name of the country was  km-m-t:O49  (𓆎 𓅓 𓏏𓊖) , which means black land, likely referring to the fertile black soils of the Nile flood plains, distinct from the deshret, or "red land" of the desert. This name is commonly vocalised as Kemet, but was probably pronounced  in ancient Egyptian. Another name was  "land of the riverbank". The names of Upper and Lower Egypt were Ta-Sheme'aw "sedgeland" and Ta-Mehew "northland", respectively.

History

Prehistory and Ancient Egypt 

There is evidence of rock carvings along the Nile terraces and in desert oases. In the 10th millennium BCE, a culture of hunter-gatherers and fishers was replaced by a grain-grinding culture. Climate changes or overgrazing around 8000 BCE began to desiccate the pastoral lands of Egypt, forming the Sahara. Early tribal peoples migrated to the Nile River where they developed a settled agricultural economy and more centralised society.

By about 6000 BCE, a Neolithic culture took root in the Nile Valley. During the Neolithic era, several predynastic cultures developed independently in Upper and Lower Egypt. The Badarian culture and the successor Naqada series are generally regarded as precursors to dynastic Egypt. The earliest known Lower Egyptian site, Merimda, predates the Badarian by about seven hundred years. Contemporaneous Lower Egyptian communities coexisted with their southern counterparts for more than two thousand years, remaining culturally distinct, but maintaining frequent contact through trade. The earliest known evidence of Egyptian hieroglyphic inscriptions appeared during the predynastic period on Naqada III pottery vessels, dated to about 3200 BCE.

A unified kingdom was founded  BCE by King Menes, leading to a series of dynasties that ruled Egypt for the next three millennia. Egyptian culture flourished during this long period and remained distinctively Egyptian in its religion, arts, language and customs. The first two ruling dynasties of a unified Egypt set the stage for the Old Kingdom period,  BCE, which constructed many pyramids, most notably the Third Dynasty pyramid of Djoser and the Fourth Dynasty Giza pyramids.

The First Intermediate Period ushered in a time of political upheaval for about 150 years. Stronger Nile floods and stabilisation of government, however, brought back renewed prosperity for the country in the Middle Kingdom  BCE, reaching a peak during the reign of Pharaoh Amenemhat III. A second period of disunity heralded the arrival of the first foreign ruling dynasty in Egypt, that of the Semitic Hyksos. The Hyksos invaders took over much of Lower Egypt around 1650 BCE and founded a new capital at Avaris. They were driven out by an Upper Egyptian force led by Ahmose I, who founded the Eighteenth Dynasty and relocated the capital from Memphis to Thebes.

The New Kingdom  BCE began with the Eighteenth Dynasty, marking the rise of Egypt as an international power that expanded during its greatest extension to an empire as far south as Tombos in Nubia, and included parts of the Levant in the east. This period is noted for some of the most well known Pharaohs, including Hatshepsut, Thutmose III, Akhenaten and his wife Nefertiti, Tutankhamun and Ramesses II. The first historically attested expression of monotheism came during this period as Atenism. Frequent contacts with other nations brought new ideas to the New Kingdom. The country was later invaded and conquered by Libyans, Nubians and Assyrians, but native Egyptians eventually drove them out and regained control of their country.

Achaemenid Egypt 

In 525 BCE, the powerful Achaemenid Persians, led by Cambyses II, began their conquest of Egypt, eventually capturing the pharaoh Psamtik III at the battle of Pelusium. Cambyses II then assumed the formal title of pharaoh, but ruled Egypt from his home of Susa in Persia (modern Iran), leaving Egypt under the control of a satrapy. The entire Twenty-seventh Dynasty of Egypt, from 525 to 402 BCE, save for Petubastis III, was an entirely Persian ruled period, with the Achaemenid Emperors all being granted the title of pharaoh. A few temporarily successful revolts against the Persians marked the fifth century BCE, but Egypt was never able to permanently overthrow the Persians.

The Thirtieth Dynasty was the last native ruling dynasty during the Pharaonic epoch. It fell to the Persians again in 343 BCE after the last native Pharaoh, King Nectanebo II, was defeated in battle. This Thirty-first Dynasty of Egypt, however, did not last long, as the Persians were toppled several decades later by Alexander the Great. The Macedonian Greek general of Alexander, Ptolemy I Soter, founded the Ptolemaic dynasty.

Ptolemaic and Roman Egypt 

The Ptolemaic Kingdom was a powerful Hellenistic state, extending from southern Syria in the east, to Cyrene to the west, and south to the frontier with Nubia. Alexandria became the capital city and a centre of Greek culture and trade. To gain recognition by the native Egyptian populace, they named themselves as the successors to the Pharaohs. The later Ptolemies took on Egyptian traditions, had themselves portrayed on public monuments in Egyptian style and dress, and participated in Egyptian religious life.

The last ruler from the Ptolemaic line was Cleopatra VII, who committed suicide following the burial of her lover Mark Antony who had died in her arms (from a self-inflicted stab wound), after Octavian had captured Alexandria and her mercenary forces had fled.
The Ptolemies faced rebellions of native Egyptians often caused by an unwanted regime and were involved in foreign and civil wars that led to the decline of the kingdom and its annexation by Rome. Nevertheless, Hellenistic culture continued to thrive in Egypt well after the Muslim conquest.

Christianity was brought to Egypt by Saint Mark the Evangelist in the 1st century. Diocletian's reign (284–305 CE) marked the transition from the Roman to the Byzantine era in Egypt, when a great number of Egyptian Christians were persecuted. The New Testament had by then been translated into Egyptian. After the Council of Chalcedon in CE 451, a distinct Egyptian Coptic Church was firmly established.

Middle Ages (7th century – 1517) 

The Byzantines were able to regain control of the country after a brief Sasanid Persian invasion early in the 7th century amidst the Byzantine–Sasanian War of 602–628 during which they established a new short-lived province for ten years known as Sasanian Egypt, until 639–42, when Egypt was invaded and
conquered by the Islamic caliphate by the Muslim Arabs. When they defeated the Byzantine armies in Egypt, the Arabs brought Islam to the country. Some time during this period, Egyptians began to blend in their new faith with indigenous beliefs and practices, leading to various Sufi orders that have flourished to this day. These earlier rites had survived the period of Coptic Christianity.

In 639 an army of around 4,000 men were sent in Egypt by the second caliph, Umar, under the command of Amr ibn al-As. They were joined by additional 5,000 men in 640 and defeated a Roman army at the battle of Heliopolis. Amr next proceeded in the direction of Alexandria, which surrendered to him by a treaty signed on 8 November 641. Alexandria was regained for the Byzantine Empire in 645 but was retaken by Amr in 646. In 654 an invasion fleet sent by Constans II was repulsed. From that time no serious effort was made by the Byzantine Romans to regain possession of the country.

The Arabs founded the capital of Egypt called Fustat, which was later burned down during the Crusades. Cairo was later built in the year 986 to grow to become the largest and richest city in the Arab caliphate, second only to Baghdad and one of the biggest and richest in the world.

Abbasid period 

The Abbasid period was marked by new taxations, and the Copts revolted again in the fourth year of Abbasid rule. At the beginning of the 9th century the practice of ruling Egypt through a governor was resumed under Abdallah ibn Tahir, who decided to reside at Baghdad, sending a deputy to Egypt to govern for him. In 828 another Egyptian revolt broke out, and in 831 the Copts joined with native Muslims against the government. Eventually the power loss of the Abbasids in Baghdad has led for general upon general to take over rule of Egypt, yet being under Abbasid allegiance, the Tulunid dynasty (868–905) and Ikhshidid dynasty (935–969) were among the most successful to defy the Abbasid Caliph.

Fatimids, Ayyubids and Mamluks 

Muslim rulers remained in control of Egypt for the next six centuries, with Cairo as the seat of the Fatimid Caliphate. With the end of the Ayyubid dynasty, the Mamluks, a Turco-Circassian military caste, took control about 1250. By the late 13th century, Egypt linked the Red Sea, India, Malaya, and East Indies. The mid-14th-century Black Death killed about 40% of the country's population.

Early modern period: Ottoman Egypt (1517–1867) 

Egypt was conquered by the Ottoman Turks in 1517, after which it became a province of the Ottoman Empire. The defensive militarisation damaged its civil society and economic institutions. The weakening of the economic system combined with the effects of plague left Egypt vulnerable to foreign invasion. Portuguese traders took over their trade. Between 1687 and 1731, Egypt experienced six famines. The 1784 famine cost it roughly one-sixth of its population.

Egypt was always a difficult province for the Ottoman Sultans to control, due in part to the continuing power and influence of the Mamluks, the Egyptian military caste who had ruled the country for centuries.

Egypt remained semi-autonomous under the Mamluks until it was invaded by the French forces of Napoleon Bonaparte in 1798 (see French campaign in Egypt and Syria). After the French were defeated by the British, a power vacuum was created in Egypt, and a three-way power struggle ensued between the Ottoman Turks, Egyptian Mamluks who had ruled Egypt for centuries, and Albanian mercenaries in the service of the Ottomans.

Muhammad Ali dynasty 

After the French were expelled, power was seized in 1805 by Muhammad Ali Pasha, an Albanian military commander of the Ottoman army in Egypt. While he carried the title of viceroy of Egypt, his subordination to the Ottoman porte was merely nominal. Muhammad Ali massacred the Mamluks and established a dynasty that was to rule Egypt until the revolution of 1952.

The introduction in 1820 of long-staple cotton transformed its agriculture into a cash-crop monoculture before the end of the century, concentrating land ownership and shifting production towards international markets.

Muhammad Ali annexed Northern Sudan (1820–1824), Syria (1833), and parts of Arabia and Anatolia; but in 1841 the European powers, fearful lest he topple the Ottoman Empire itself, forced him to return most of his conquests to the Ottomans. His military ambition required him to modernise the country: he built industries, a system of canals for irrigation and transport, and reformed the civil service.

He constructed a military state with around four percent of the populace serving the army to raise Egypt to a powerful positioning in the Ottoman Empire in a way showing various similarities to the Soviet strategies (without communism) conducted in the 20th century.

Muhammad Ali Pasha evolved the military from one that convened under the tradition of the corvée to a great modernised army. He introduced conscription of the male peasantry in 19th century Egypt, and took a novel approach to create his great army, strengthening it with numbers and in skill. Education and training of the new soldiers became mandatory; the new concepts were furthermore enforced by isolation. The men were held in barracks to avoid distraction of their growth as a military unit to be reckoned with. The resentment for the military way of life eventually faded from the men and a new ideology took hold, one of nationalism and pride. It was with the help of this newly reborn martial unit that Muhammad Ali imposed his rule over Egypt.

The policy that Mohammad Ali Pasha followed during his reign explains partly why the numeracy in Egypt compared to other North-African and Middle-Eastern countries increased only at a remarkably small rate, as investment in further education only took place in the military and industrial sector.

Muhammad Ali was succeeded briefly by his son Ibrahim (in September 1848), then by a grandson Abbas I (in November 1848), then by Said (in 1854), and Isma'il (in 1863) who encouraged science and agriculture and banned slavery in Egypt.

Khedivate of Egypt (1867–1914) 

Egypt under the Muhammad Ali dynasty remained nominally an Ottoman province. It was granted the status of an autonomous vassal state or Khedivate in 1867, a legal status which was to remain in place until 1914 although the Ottomans had no power or presence.

The Suez Canal, built in partnership with the French, was completed in 1869. Its construction was financed by European banks. Large sums also went to patronage and corruption. New taxes caused popular discontent. In 1875 Isma'il avoided bankruptcy by selling all Egypt's shares in the canal to the British government. Within three years this led to the imposition of British and French controllers who sat in the Egyptian cabinet, and, "with the financial power of the bondholders behind them, were the real power in the Government."

Other circumstances like epidemic diseases (cattle disease in the 1880s), floods and wars drove the economic downturn and increased Egypt's dependency on foreign debt even further.

Local dissatisfaction with the Khedive and with European intrusion led to the formation of the first nationalist groupings in 1879, with Ahmed ʻUrabi a prominent figure. After increasing tensions and nationalist revolts, the United Kingdom invaded Egypt in 1882, crushing the Egyptian army at the Battle of Tell El Kebir and militarily occupying the country. Following this, the Khedivate became a de facto British protectorate under nominal Ottoman sovereignty.

In 1899 the Anglo-Egyptian Condominium Agreement was signed: the Agreement stated that Sudan would be jointly governed by the Khedivate of Egypt and the United Kingdom. However, actual control of Sudan was in British hands only.

In 1906, the Denshawai incident prompted many neutral Egyptians to join the nationalist movement.

Sultanate of Egypt (1914–1922) 

In 1914 the Ottoman Empire entered World War I in alliance with the Central Empires; Khedive Abbas II (who had grown increasingly hostile to the British in preceding years) decided to support the motherland in war. Following such decision, the British forcibly removed him from power and replaced him with his brother Hussein Kamel.

Hussein Kamel declared Egypt's independence from the Ottoman Empire, assuming the title of Sultan of Egypt. Shortly following independence, Egypt was declared a protectorate of the United Kingdom.

After World War I, Saad Zaghlul and the Wafd Party led the Egyptian nationalist movement to a majority at the local Legislative Assembly. When the British exiled Zaghlul and his associates to Malta on 8 March 1919, the country arose in its first modern revolution. The revolt led the UK government to issue a unilateral declaration of Egypt's independence on 22 February 1922.

Kingdom of Egypt (1922–1953) 

Following independence from the United Kingdom, Sultan Fuad I assumed the title of King of Egypt; despite being nominally independent, the Kingdom was still under British military occupation and the UK still had great influence over the state.
The new government drafted and implemented a constitution in 1923 based on a parliamentary system. The nationalist Wafd Party won a landslide victory in the 1923–1924 election and Saad Zaghloul was appointed as the new Prime Minister.

In 1936, the Anglo-Egyptian Treaty was concluded and British troops withdrew from Egypt, except for the Suez Canal. The treaty did not resolve the question of Sudan, which, under the terms of the existing Anglo-Egyptian Condominium Agreement of 1899, stated that Sudan should be jointly governed by Egypt and Britain, but with real power remaining in British hands.

Britain used Egypt as a base for Allied operations throughout the region, especially the battles in North Africa against Italy and Germany. Its highest priorities were control of the Eastern Mediterranean, and especially keeping the Suez Canal open for merchant ships and for military connections with India and Australia. The government of Egypt, and the Egyptian population, played a minor role in the Second World War. When the war began in September 1939, Egypt declared martial law and broke off diplomatic relations with Germany. It did not declare war on Germany, but the Prime Minister associated Egypt with the British war effort. It broke diplomatic relations with Italy in 1940, but never declared war, even when the Italian army invaded Egypt. King Farouk took practically a neutral position, which accorded with elite opinion among the Egyptians. The Egyptian army did no fighting. It was apathetic about the war, with the leading officers looking on the British as occupiers and sometimes holding some private sympathy with the Axis. In June 1940 the King dismissed Prime Minister Aly Maher, who got on poorly with the British. A new coalition Government was formed with the Independent Hassan Pasha Sabri as Prime Minister.

Following a ministerial crisis in February 1942, the ambassador Sir Miles Lampson, pressed Farouk to have a Wafd or Wafd-coalition government replace Hussein Sirri Pasha's government. On the night of 4 February 1942, British troops and tanks surrounded Abdeen Palace in Cairo and Lampson presented Farouk with an ultimatum. Farouk capitulated, and Nahhas formed a government shortly thereafter. However, the humiliation meted out to Farouk, and the actions of the Wafd in cooperating with the British and taking power, lost support for both the British and the Wafd among both civilians and, more importantly, the Egyptian military.

Most British troops were withdrawn to the Suez Canal area in 1947 (although the British army maintained a military base in the area), but nationalist, anti-British feelings continued to grow after the War. Anti-monarchy sentiments further increased following the disastrous performance of the Kingdom in the First Arab-Israeli War. The 1950 election saw a landslide victory of the nationalist Wafd Party and the King was forced to appoint Mostafa El-Nahas as new Prime Minister. In 1951 Egypt unilaterally withdrew from the Anglo-Egyptian Treaty of 1936 and ordered all remaining British troops to leave the Suez Canal.

As the British refused to leave their base around the Suez Canal, the Egyptian government cut off the water and refused to allow food into the Suez Canal base, announced a boycott of British goods, forbade Egyptian workers from entering the base and sponsored guerrilla attacks, turning the area around the Suez Canal into a low level war zone. On 24 January 1952, Egyptian guerrillas staged a fierce attack on the British forces around the Suez Canal, during which the Egyptian Auxiliary Police were observed helping the guerrillas. In response, on 25 January, General George Erskine sent out British tanks and infantry to surround the auxiliary police station in Ismailia and gave the policemen an hour to surrender their arms on the grounds the police were arming the guerrillas. The police commander called the Interior Minister, Fouad Serageddin, Nahas's right-hand man, who was smoking cigars in his bath at the time, to ask if he should surrender or fight. Serageddin ordered the police to fight "to the last man and the last bullet". The resulting battle saw the police station levelled and 43 Egyptian policemen killed together with 3 British soldiers. The Ismailia incident outraged Egypt. The next day, 26 January 1952 was "Black Saturday", as the anti-British riot was known, that saw much of downtown Cairo which the Khedive Ismail the Magnificent had rebuilt in the style of Paris, burned down. Farouk blamed the Wafd for the Black Saturday riot, and dismissed Nahas as prime minister the next day. He was replaced by Aly Maher Pasha.

On 22–23 July 1952, the Free Officers Movement, led by Muhammad Naguib and Gamal Abdel Nasser, launched a coup d'état (Egyptian Revolution of 1952) against the king. Farouk I abdicated the throne to his son Fouad II, who was, at the time, a seven-month-old baby. The Royal Family left Egypt some days later and the Council of Regency, led by Prince Muhammad Abdel Moneim was formed, The council, however, held only nominal authority and the real power was actually in the hands of the Revolutionary Command Council, led by Naguib and Nasser.

Popular expectations for immediate reforms led to the workers' riots in Kafr Dawar on 12 August 1952, which resulted in two death sentences. Following a brief experiment with civilian rule, the Free Officers abrogated the monarchy and the 1923 constitution and declared Egypt a republic on 18 June 1953. Naguib was proclaimed as president, while Nasser was appointed as the new Prime Minister.

Republic of Egypt (1953–1958) 

Following the 1952 Revolution by the Free Officers Movement, the rule of Egypt passed to military hands and all political parties were banned. On 18 June 1953, the Egyptian Republic was declared, with General Muhammad Naguib as the first President of the Republic, serving in that capacity for a little under one and a half years.

President Nasser (1956–1970) 

Naguib was forced to resign in 1954 by Gamal Abdel Nassera Pan-Arabist and the real architect of the 1952 movementand was later put under house arrest. After Naguib's resignation, the position of President was vacant until the election of Gamal Abdel Nasser in 1956.

In October 1954 Egypt and the United Kingdom agreed to abolish the Anglo-Egyptian Condominium Agreement of 1899 and grant Sudan independence; the agreement came into force on 1 January 1956.

Nasser assumed power as president in June 1956. British forces completed their withdrawal from the occupied Suez Canal Zone on 13 June 1956. He nationalised the Suez Canal on 26 July 1956; his hostile approach towards Israel and economic nationalism prompted the beginning of the Second Arab-Israeli War (Suez Crisis), in which Israel (with support from France and the United Kingdom) occupied the Sinai peninsula and the Canal. The war came to an end because of US and USSR diplomatic intervention and the status quo was restored.

United Arab Republic (1958–1971) 

In 1958, Egypt and Syria formed a sovereign union known as the United Arab Republic. The union was short-lived, ending in 1961 when Syria seceded, thus ending the union. During most of its existence, the United Arab Republic was also in a loose confederation with North Yemen (or the Mutawakkilite Kingdom of Yemen), known as the United Arab States. In 1959, the All-Palestine Government of the Gaza Strip, an Egyptian client state, was absorbed into the United Arab Republic under the pretext of Arab union, and was never restored. The Arab Socialist Union, a new nasserist state-party was founded in 1962.

In the early 1960s, Egypt became fully involved in the North Yemen Civil War. The Egyptian President, Gamal Abdel Nasser, supported the Yemeni republicans with as many as 70,000 Egyptian troops and chemical weapons. Despite several military moves and peace conferences, the war sank into a stalemate. Egyptian commitment in Yemen was greatly undermined later.

In mid May 1967, the Soviet Union issued warnings to Nasser of an impending Israeli attack on Syria. Although the chief of staff Mohamed Fawzi verified them as "baseless", Nasser took three successive steps that made the war virtually inevitable: on 14 May he deployed his troops in Sinai near the border with Israel, on 19 May he expelled the UN peacekeepers stationed in the Sinai Peninsula border with Israel, and on 23 May he closed the Straits of Tiran to Israeli shipping. On 26 May Nasser declared, "The battle will be a general one and our basic objective will be to destroy Israel".

Israel re-iterated that the Straits of Tiran closure was a Casus belli. This prompted the beginning of the Third Arab Israeli War (Six-Day War) in which Israel attacked Egypt, and occupied Sinai Peninsula and the Gaza Strip, which Egypt had occupied since the 1948 Arab–Israeli War. During the 1967 war, an Emergency Law was enacted, and remained in effect until 2012, with the exception of an 18-month break in 1980/81. Under this law, police powers were extended, constitutional rights suspended and censorship legalised.

At the time of the fall of the Egyptian monarchy in the early 1950s, less than half a million Egyptians were considered upper class and rich, four million middle class and 17 million lower class and poor. Fewer than half of all primary-school-age children attended school, most of them being boys. Nasser's policies changed this. Land reform and distribution, the dramatic growth in university education, and government support to national industries greatly improved social mobility and flattened the social curve. From academic year 1953–54 through 1965–66, overall public school enrolments more than doubled. Millions of previously poor Egyptians, through education and jobs in the public sector, joined the middle class. Doctors, engineers, teachers, lawyers, journalists, constituted the bulk of the swelling middle class in Egypt under Nasser. During the 1960s, the Egyptian economy went from sluggish to the verge of collapse, the society became less free, and Nasser's appeal waned considerably.

Arab Republic of Egypt (1971–present)

President Sadat (1970–1981) 

In 1970, President Nasser died of a heart attack and was succeeded by Anwar Sadat. Sadat switched Egypt's Cold War allegiance from the Soviet Union to the United States, expelling Soviet advisors in 1972. He launched the Infitah economic reform policy, while clamping down on religious and secular opposition. In 1973, Egypt, along with Syria, launched the Fourth Arab-Israeli War (Yom Kippur War), a surprise attack to regain part of the Sinai territory Israel had captured 6 years earlier. Eventually Israel won the war, but early successes restored Egypt's confidence and morale, allowing Sadat to later regain Sinai in exchange for peace with Israel.

In 1975, Sadat shifted Nasser's economic policies and sought to use his popularity to reduce government regulations and encourage foreign investment through his program of Infitah. Through this policy, incentives such as reduced taxes and import tariffs attracted some investors, but investments were mainly directed at low risk and profitable ventures like tourism and construction, abandoning Egypt's infant industries. Even though Sadat's policy was intended to modernise Egypt and assist the middle class, it mainly benefited the higher class, and, because of the elimination of subsidies on basic foodstuffs, led to the 1977 Egyptian Bread Riots.

In 1977, Sadat dissolved the Arab Socialist Union and replaced it with the National Democratic Party.

Sadat made a historic visit to Israel in 1977, which led to the 1979 Egypt-Israel peace treaty in exchange for Israeli withdrawal from Sinai. In return, Egypt recognized Israel as a legitimate sovereign state. Sadat's initiative sparked enormous controversy in the Arab world and led to Egypt's expulsion from the Arab League, but it was supported by most Egyptians. Sadat was assassinated by an Islamic extremist in October 1981.

President Mubarak (1981–2011) 
Hosni Mubarak came to power after the assassination of Sadat in a referendum in which he was the only candidate.

Hosni Mubarak reaffirmed Egypt's relationship with Israel yet eased the tensions with Egypt's Arab neighbours. Domestically, Mubarak faced serious problems. Even though farm and industry output expanded, the economy could not keep pace with the population boom. Mass poverty and unemployment led rural families to stream into cities like Cairo where they ended up in crowded slums, barely managing to survive.

On 25 February 1986, the Security Police started rioting, protesting against reports that their term of duty was to be extended from 3 to 4 years. Hotels, nightclubs, restaurants and casinos were attacked in Cairo and there were riots in other cities. A day time curfew was imposed. It took the army 3 days to restore order. 107 people were killed.

In the 1980s, 1990s, and 2000s, terrorist attacks in Egypt became numerous and severe, and began to target Christian Copts, foreign tourists and government officials. In the 1990s an Islamist group, Al-Gama'a al-Islamiyya, engaged in an extended campaign of violence, from the murders and attempted murders of prominent writers and intellectuals, to the repeated targeting of tourists and foreigners. Serious damage was done to the largest sector of Egypt's economy—tourism—and in turn to the government, but it also devastated the livelihoods of many of the people on whom the group depended for support.

During Mubarak's reign, the political scene was dominated by the National Democratic Party, which was created by Sadat in 1978. It passed the 1993 Syndicates Law, 1995 Press Law, and 1999 Nongovernmental Associations Law which hampered freedoms of association and expression by imposing new regulations and draconian penalties on violations. As a result, by the late 1990s parliamentary politics had become virtually irrelevant and alternative avenues for political expression were curtailed as well.

On 17 November 1997, 62 people, mostly tourists, were massacred near Luxor.

In late February 2005, Mubarak announced a reform of the presidential election law, paving the way for multi-candidate polls for the first time since the 1952 movement. However, the new law placed restrictions on the candidates, and led to Mubarak's easy re-election victory. Voter turnout was less than 25%. Election observers also alleged government interference in the election process. After the election, Mubarak imprisoned Ayman Nour, the runner-up.

Human Rights Watch's 2006 report on Egypt detailed serious human rights violations, including routine torture, arbitrary detentions and trials before military and state security courts. In 2007, Amnesty International released a report alleging that Egypt had become an international centre for torture, where other nations send suspects for interrogation, often as part of the War on Terror. Egypt's foreign ministry quickly issued a rebuttal to this report.

Constitutional changes voted on 19 March 2007 prohibited parties from using religion as a basis for political activity, allowed the drafting of a new anti-terrorism law, authorised broad police powers of arrest and surveillance, and gave the president power to dissolve parliament and end judicial election monitoring. In 2009, Dr. Ali El Deen Hilal Dessouki, Media Secretary of the National Democratic Party (NDP), described Egypt as a "pharaonic" political system, and democracy as a "long-term goal". Dessouki also stated that "the real center of power in Egypt is the military".

Revolution (2011) 

On 25 January 2011, widespread protests began against Mubarak's government. On 11 February 2011, Mubarak resigned and fled Cairo. Jubilant celebrations broke out in Cairo's Tahrir Square at the news. The Egyptian military then assumed the power to govern. Mohamed Hussein Tantawi, chairman of the Supreme Council of the Armed Forces, became the de facto interim head of state. On 13 February 2011, the military dissolved the parliament and suspended the constitution.

A constitutional referendum was held on 19 March 2011. On 28 November 2011, Egypt held its first parliamentary election since the previous regime had been in power. Turnout was high and there were no reports of major irregularities or violence.

President Morsi (2012–2013) 
Mohamed Morsi was elected president on 24 June 2012. On 30 June 2012, Mohamed Morsi was sworn in as Egypt’s president. On 2 August 2012, Egypt's Prime Minister Hisham Qandil announced his 35-member cabinet comprising 28 newcomers, including four from the Muslim Brotherhood.

Liberal and secular groups walked out of the constituent assembly because they believed that it would impose strict Islamic practices, while Muslim Brotherhood backers threw their support behind Morsi. On 22 November 2012, President Morsi issued a temporary declaration immunising his decrees from challenge and seeking to protect the work of the constituent assembly.

The move led to massive protests and violent action throughout Egypt. On 5 December 2012, tens of thousands of supporters and opponents of President Morsi clashed, in what was described as the largest violent battle between Islamists and their foes since the country's revolution. Mohamed Morsi offered a "national dialogue" with opposition leaders but refused to cancel the December 2012 constitutional referendum.

Political crisis (2013) 

On 3 July 2013, after a wave of public discontent with autocratic excesses of Morsi's Muslim Brotherhood government, the military removed Morsi from office, dissolved the Shura Council and installed a temporary interim government.

On 4 July 2013, 68-year-old Chief Justice of the Supreme Constitutional Court of Egypt Adly Mansour was sworn in as acting president over the new government following the removal of Morsi. The new Egyptian authorities cracked down on the Muslim Brotherhood and its supporters, jailing thousands and forcefully dispersing pro-Morsi and pro-Brotherhood protests. Many of the Muslim Brotherhood leaders and activists have either been sentenced to death or life imprisonment in a series of mass trials.

On 18 January 2014, the interim government instituted a new constitution following a referendum approved by an overwhelming majority of voters (98.1%). 38.6% of registered voters participated in the referendum a higher number than the 33% who voted in a referendum during Morsi's tenure.

President el-Sisi (2014–present) 

On 26 March 2014, Field Marshal Abdel Fattah el-Sisi, Egyptian Defence Minister and Commander-in-Chief Egyptian Armed Forces, retired from the military, announcing he would stand as a candidate in the 2014 presidential election. The poll, held between 26 and 28 May 2014, resulted in a landslide victory for el-Sisi. Sisi was sworn into office as President of Egypt on 8 June 2014. The Muslim Brotherhood and some liberal and secular activist groups boycotted the vote. Even though the interim authorities extended voting to a third day, the 46% turnout was lower than the 52% turnout in the 2012 election.

A new parliamentary election was held in December 2015, resulting in a landslide victory for pro-Sisi parties, which secured a strong majority in the newly formed House of Representatives.

In 2016, Egypt entered in a diplomatic crisis with Italy following the murder of researcher Giulio Regeni: in April 2016, Prime Minister Matteo Renzi recalled the Italian ambassador from Cairo because of lack of co-operation from the Egyptian Government in the investigation. The ambassador was sent back to Egypt in 2017 by the new Prime Minister Paolo Gentiloni.

El-Sisi was re-elected in 2018, facing no serious opposition. In 2019, a series of constitutional amendments were approved by the parliament, further increasing the President's and the military's power, increasing presidential terms from 4 years to 6 years and allowing El-Sisi to run for another two mandates. The proposals were approved in a referendum.

The dispute between Egypt and Ethiopia over the Grand Ethiopian Renaissance Dam escalated in 2020. Egypt sees the dam as an existential threat, fearing that the dam will reduce the amount of water it receives from the Nile.

In December 2020, final results of the parliamentary election confirmed a clear majority of the seats for Egypt’s Mostaqbal Watn (Nation’s Future) Party, which strongly supports president el-Sisi. The party even increased its majority, partly because of new electoral rules.

Geography 

Egypt lies primarily between latitudes 22° and 32°N, and longitudes 25° and 35°E. At , it is the world's 30th-largest country. Due to the extreme aridity of Egypt's climate, population centres are concentrated along the narrow Nile Valley and Delta, meaning that about 99% of the population uses about 5.5% of the total land area. 98% of Egyptians live on 3% of the territory.

Egypt is bordered by Libya to the west, the Sudan to the south, and the Gaza Strip and Israel to the east. Egypt's important role in geopolitics stems from its strategic position: a transcontinental nation, it possesses a land bridge (the Isthmus of Suez) between Africa and Asia, traversed by a navigable waterway (the Suez Canal) that connects the Mediterranean Sea with the Indian Ocean by way of the Red Sea.

Apart from the Nile Valley, the majority of Egypt's landscape is desert, with a few oases scattered about. Egypt includes parts of the Sahara desert and of the Libyan Desert. These deserts protected the Kingdom of the Pharaohs from western threats and were referred to as the "red land" in ancient Egypt.

Towns and cities include Alexandria, the second largest city; Aswan; Asyut; Cairo, the modern Egyptian capital and largest city; El Mahalla El Kubra; Giza, the site of the Pyramid of Khufu; Hurghada; Luxor; Kom Ombo; Port Safaga; Port Said; Sharm El Sheikh; Suez, where the south end of the Suez Canal is located; Zagazig; and Minya. Oases include Bahariya, Dakhla, Farafra, Kharga and Siwa. Protectorates include Ras Mohamed National Park, Zaranik Protectorate and Siwa.

On 13 March 2015, plans for a proposed new capital of Egypt were announced.

Climate 

Most of Egypt's rain falls in the winter months. Snow falls on Sinai's mountains and some of the north coastal cities such as Damietta, Baltim and Sidi Barrani, and rarely in Alexandria. A very small amount of snow fell on Cairo on 13 December 2013, the first time in many decades. Frost is also known in mid-Sinai and mid-Egypt. Egypt is the driest and the sunniest country in the world, and most of its land surface is desert.

Egypt has an unusually hot, sunny and dry climate. Average high temperatures are high in the north but very to extremely high in the rest of the country during summer. The cooler Mediterranean winds consistently blow over the northern sea coast, which helps to get more moderated temperatures, especially at the height of the summertime. The Khamaseen is a hot, dry wind that originates from the vast deserts in the south and blows in the spring or in the early summer. The absolute highest temperatures in Egypt occur when the Khamaseen blows. The weather is always sunny and clear in Egypt, especially in cities such as Aswan, Luxor and Asyut. It is one of the least cloudy and least rainy regions on Earth.

Prior to the construction of the Aswan Dam, the Nile flooded annually (colloquially The Gift of the Nile) replenishing Egypt's soil. This gave Egypt a consistent harvest throughout the years.

The potential rise in sea levels due to global warming could threaten Egypt's densely populated coastal strip and have grave consequences for the country's economy, agriculture and industry. Combined with growing demographic pressures, a significant rise in sea levels could turn millions of Egyptians into environmental refugees by the end of the 21st century, according to some climate experts.

Biodiversity 

Egypt signed the Rio Convention on Biological Diversity on 9 June 1992, and became a party to the convention on 2 June 1994. It has subsequently produced a National Biodiversity Strategy and Action Plan, which was received by the convention on 31 July 1998. Where many CBD National Biodiversity Strategy and Action Plans neglect biological kingdoms apart from animals and plants, Egypt's plan was unusual in providing balanced information about all forms of life.

The plan stated that the following numbers of species of different groups had been recorded from Egypt: algae (1483 species), animals (about 15,000 species of which more than 10,000 were insects), fungi (more than 627 species), monera (319 species), plants (2426 species), protozoans (371 species). For some major groups, for example lichen-forming fungi and nematode worms, the number was not known. Apart from small and well-studied groups like amphibians, birds, fish, mammals and reptiles, the many of those numbers are likely to increase as further species are recorded from Egypt. For the fungi, including lichen-forming species, for example, subsequent work has shown that over 2200 species have been recorded from Egypt, and the final figure of all fungi actually occurring in the country is expected to be much higher. For the grasses, 284 native and naturalised species have been identified and recorded in Egypt.

Government 

The House of Representatives, whose members are elected to serve five-year terms, specialises in legislation. Elections were last held between November 2011 and January 2012 which was later dissolved. The next parliamentary election was announced to be held within 6 months of the constitution's ratification on 18 January 2014, and were held in two phases, from 17 October to 2 December 2015. Originally, the parliament was to be formed before the president was elected, but interim president Adly Mansour pushed the date. The 2014 Egyptian presidential election took place on 26–28 May. Official figures showed a turnout of 25,578,233 or 47.5%, with Abdel Fattah el-Sisi winning with 23.78 million votes, or 96.9% compared to 757,511 (3.1%) for Hamdeen Sabahi.

After a wave of public discontent with autocratic excesses of the Muslim Brotherhood government of President Mohamed Morsi, on 3 July 2013 then-General Abdel Fattah el-Sisi announced the removal of Morsi from office and the suspension of the constitution. A 50-member constitution committee was formed for modifying the constitution which was later published for public voting and was adopted on 18 January 2014.

In 2013, Freedom House rated political rights in Egypt at 5 (with 1 representing the most free and 7 the least), and civil liberties at 5, which gave it the freedom rating of "Partly Free".

Egyptian nationalism predates its Arab counterpart by many decades, having roots in the 19th century and becoming the dominant mode of expression of Egyptian anti-colonial activists and intellectuals until the early 20th century. The ideology espoused by Islamists such as the Muslim Brotherhood is mostly supported by the lower-middle strata of Egyptian society.

Egypt has the oldest continuous parliamentary tradition in the Arab world. The first popular assembly was established in 1866. It was disbanded as a result of the British occupation of 1882, and the British allowed only a consultative body to sit. In 1923, however, after the country's independence was declared, a new constitution provided for a parliamentary monarchy.

Military and foreign relations 

The military is influential in the political and economic life of Egypt and exempts itself from laws that apply to other sectors. It enjoys considerable power, prestige and independence within the state and has been widely considered part of the Egyptian "deep state".

Egypt is speculated by Israel to be the second country in the region with a spy satellite, EgyptSat 1 in addition to EgyptSat 2 launched on 16 April 2014.

The United States provides Egypt with annual military assistance, which in 2015 amounted to US$1.3 billion. In 1989, Egypt was designated as a major non-NATO ally of the United States. Nevertheless, ties between the two countries have partially soured since the July 2013 overthrow of Islamist president Mohamed Morsi, with the Obama administration denouncing Egypt over its crackdown on the Muslim Brotherhood, and cancelling future military exercises involving the two countries. There have been recent attempts, however, to normalise relations between the two, with both governments frequently calling for mutual support in the fight against regional and international terrorism. However, following the election of Republican Donald Trump as the President of the United States, the two countries were looking to improve the Egyptian-American relations. On 3 April 2017 al-Sisi met with Trump at the White House, marking the first visit of an Egyptian president to Washington in 8 years. Trump praised al-Sisi in what was reported as a public relations victory for the Egyptian president, and signaled it was time for a normalization of the relations between Egypt and the US.

Relations with Russia have improved significantly following Mohamed Morsi's removal and both countries have worked since then to strengthen military and trade ties among other aspects of bilateral co-operation. Relations with China have also improved considerably. In 2014, Egypt and China established a bilateral "comprehensive strategic partnership". In July 2019, UN ambassadors of 37 countries, including Egypt, have signed a joint letter to the UNHRC defending China's treatment of Uyghurs in the Xinjiang region.

The permanent headquarters of the Arab League are located in Cairo and the body's secretary general has traditionally been Egyptian. This position is currently held by former foreign minister Ahmed Aboul Gheit. The Arab League briefly moved from Egypt to Tunis in 1978 to protest the Egypt–Israel peace treaty, but it later returned to Cairo in 1989. Gulf monarchies, including the United Arab Emirates and Saudi Arabia, have pledged billions of dollars to help Egypt overcome its economic difficulties since the overthrow of Morsi.

Following the 1973 war and the subsequent peace treaty, Egypt became the first Arab nation to establish diplomatic relations with Israel. Despite that, Israel is still widely considered as a hostile state by the majority of Egyptians. Egypt has played a historical role as a mediator in resolving various disputes in the Middle East, most notably its handling of the Israeli–Palestinian conflict and the peace process. Egypt's ceasefire and truce brokering efforts in Gaza have hardly been challenged following Israel's evacuation of its settlements from the strip in 2005, despite increasing animosity towards the Hamas government in Gaza following the ouster of Mohamed Morsi, and despite recent attempts by countries like Turkey and Qatar to take over this role.

Ties between Egypt and other non-Arab Middle Eastern nations, including Iran and Turkey, have often been strained. Tensions with Iran are mostly due to Egypt's peace treaty with Israel and Iran's rivalry with traditional Egyptian allies in the Gulf. Turkey's recent support for the now-banned Muslim Brotherhood in Egypt and its alleged involvement in Libya also made both countries bitter regional rivals.

Egypt is a founding member of the Non-Aligned Movement and the United Nations. It is also a member of the Organisation internationale de la francophonie, since 1983. Former Egyptian Deputy Prime Minister Boutros Boutros-Ghali served as Secretary-General of the United Nations from 1991 to 1996.

In 2008, Egypt was estimated to have two million African refugees, including over 20,000 Sudanese nationals registered with UNHCR as refugees fleeing armed conflict or asylum seekers. Egypt adopted "harsh, sometimes lethal" methods of border control.

Law 

The legal system is based on Islamic and civil law (particularly Napoleonic codes); and judicial review by a Supreme Court, which accepts compulsory International Court of Justice jurisdiction only with reservations.

Islamic jurisprudence is the principal source of legislation. Sharia courts and qadis are run and licensed by the Ministry of Justice. The personal status law that regulates matters such as marriage, divorce and child custody is governed by Sharia. In a family court, a woman's testimony is worth half of a man's testimony.

On 26 December 2012, the Muslim Brotherhood attempted to institutionalise a controversial new constitution. It was approved by the public in a referendum held 15–22 December 2012 with 64% support, but with only 33% electorate participation. It replaced the 2011 Provisional Constitution of Egypt, adopted following the revolution.

The Penal code was unique as it contains a "Blasphemy Law." The present court system allows a death penalty including against an absent individual tried in absentia. Several Americans and Canadians were sentenced to death in 2012.

On 18 January 2014, the interim government successfully institutionalised a more secular constitution. The president is elected to a four-year term and may serve 2 terms. The parliament may impeach the president. Under the constitution, there is a guarantee of gender equality and absolute freedom of thought. The military retains the ability to appoint the national Minister of Defence for the next two full presidential terms since the constitution took effect. Under the constitution, political parties may not be based on "religion, race, gender or geography".

Human rights 

The Egyptian Organization for Human Rights is one of the longest-standing bodies for the defence of human rights in Egypt. In 2003, the government established the National Council for Human Rights. Shortly after its foundation, the council came under heavy criticism by local activists, who contend it was a propaganda tool for the government to excuse its own violations and to give legitimacy to repressive laws such as the Emergency Law.

The Pew Forum on Religion & Public Life ranks Egypt as the fifth worst country in the world for religious freedom. The United States Commission on International Religious Freedom, a bipartisan independent agency of the US government, has placed Egypt on its watch list of countries that require close monitoring due to the nature and extent of violations of religious freedom engaged in or tolerated by the government. According to a 2010 Pew Global Attitudes survey, 84% of Egyptians polled supported the death penalty for those who leave Islam; 77% supported whippings and cutting off of hands for theft and robbery; and 82% support stoning a person who commits adultery.

Coptic Christians face discrimination at multiple levels of the government, ranging from underrepresentation in government ministries to laws that limit their ability to build or repair churches. Intolerance towards followers of the Baháʼí Faith, and those of the non-orthodox Muslim sects, such as Sufis, Shi'a and Ahmadis, also remains a problem. When the government moved to computerise identification cards, members of religious minorities, such as Baháʼís, could not obtain identification documents. An Egyptian court ruled in early 2008 that members of other faiths may obtain identity cards without listing their faiths, and without becoming officially recognised.

Clashes continued between police and supporters of former President Mohamed Morsi. During violent clashes that ensued as part of the August 2013 sit-in dispersal, 595 protesters were killed with 14 August 2013 becoming the single deadliest day in Egypt's modern history.

Egypt actively practices capital punishment. Egypt's authorities do not release figures on death sentences and executions, despite repeated requests over the years by human rights organisations. The United Nations human rights office and various NGOs expressed "deep alarm" after an Egyptian Minya Criminal Court sentenced 529 people to death in a single hearing on 25 March 2014. Sentenced supporters of former President Mohamed Morsi were to be executed for their alleged role in violence following his removal in July 2013. The judgement was condemned as a violation of international law. By May 2014, approximately 16,000 people (and as high as more than 40,000 by one independent count, according to The Economist), mostly Brotherhood members or supporters, have been imprisoned after Morsi's removal after the Muslim Brotherhood was labelled as terrorist organisation by the post-Morsi interim Egyptian government. According to human rights groups there are some 60,000 political prisoners in Egypt.

After Morsi was ousted by the military, the judiciary system aligned itself with the new government, actively supporting the repression of Muslim Brotherhood members. This resulted in a sharp increase in mass death sentences that arose criticism from then-U.S. President Barack Obama and the General Secretary of the UN, Ban Ki Moon.

Homosexuality is illegal in Egypt. According to a 2013 survey by the Pew Research Center, 95% of Egyptians believe that homosexuality should not be accepted by society.

In 2017, Cairo was voted the most dangerous megacity for women with more than 10 million inhabitants in a poll by Thomson Reuters Foundation. Sexual harassment was described as occurring on a daily basis.

Freedom of the press 
Reporters Without Borders ranked Egypt in their 2017 World Press Freedom Index at  160 out of 180 nations. At least 18 journalists were imprisoned in Egypt, . A new anti-terror law was enacted in August 2015 that threatens members of the media with fines ranging from about US$25,000 to $60,000 for the distribution of wrong information on acts of terror inside the country "that differ from official declarations of the Egyptian Department of Defense".

Some critics of the government have been arrested for allegedly spreading false information about the COVID-19 pandemic in Egypt.

Administrative divisions 

Egypt is divided into 27 governorates. The governorates are further divided into regions. The regions contain towns and villages. Each governorate has a capital, sometimes carrying the same name as the governorate.

Economy 

Egypt's economy depends mainly on agriculture, media, petroleum exports, natural gas, and tourism; there are also more than three million Egyptians working abroad, mainly in Libya, Saudi Arabia, the Persian Gulf and Europe. The completion of the Aswan High Dam in 1970 and the resultant Lake Nasser have altered the time-honoured place of the Nile River in the agriculture and ecology of Egypt. A rapidly growing population, limited arable land, and dependence on the Nile all continue to overtax resources and stress the economy.

The government has invested in communications and physical infrastructure. Egypt has received United States foreign aid since 1979 (an average of $2.2 billion per year) and is the third-largest recipient of such funds from the United States following the Iraq war. Egypt's economy mainly relies on these sources of income: tourism, remittances from Egyptians working abroad and revenues from the Suez Canal.

Economic conditions have started to improve considerably, after a period of stagnation, due to the adoption of more liberal economic policies by the government as well as increased revenues from tourism and a booming stock market. In its annual report, the International Monetary Fund (IMF) has rated Egypt as one of the top countries in the world undertaking economic reforms. Some major economic reforms undertaken by the government since 2003 include a dramatic slashing of customs and tariffs. A new taxation law implemented in 2005 decreased corporate taxes from 40% to the current 20%, resulting in a stated 100% increase in tax revenue by 2006.

Although one of the main obstacles still facing the Egyptian economy is the limited trickle down of wealth to the average population, many Egyptians criticise their government for higher prices of basic goods while their standards of living or purchasing power remains relatively stagnant. Corruption is often cited by Egyptians as the main impediment to further economic growth. The government promised major reconstruction of the country's infrastructure, using money paid for the newly acquired third mobile license ($3 billion) by Etisalat in 2006. In the Corruption Perceptions Index 2013, Egypt was ranked 114 out of 177.

An estimated 2.7 million Egyptians abroad contribute actively to the development of their country through remittances (US$7.8 billion in 2009), as well as circulation of human and social capital and investment. Remittances, money earned by Egyptians living abroad and sent home, reached a record US$21 billion in 2012, according to the World Bank.

Egyptian society is moderately unequal in terms of income distribution, with an estimated 35–40% of Egypt's population earning less than the equivalent of $2 a day, while only around 2–3% may be considered wealthy.

Tourism 

Tourism is one of the most important sectors in Egypt's economy. More than 12.8 million tourists visited Egypt in 2008, providing revenues of nearly $11 billion. The tourism sector employs about 12% of Egypt's workforce. Tourism Minister Hisham Zaazou told industry professionals and reporters that tourism generated some $9.4 billion in 2012, a slight increase over the $9 billion seen in 2011.

The Giza Necropolis is one of Egypt's best-known tourist attractions; it is the only one of the Seven Wonders of the Ancient World still in existence.

Energy 

Egypt has a developed energy market based on coal, oil, natural gas, and hydro power. Oil and gas are produced in the western desert regions, the Gulf of Suez, and the Nile Delta. In 2013, the Egyptian General Petroleum Co (EGPC) said the country will cut exports of natural gas and tell major industries to slow output this summer to avoid an energy crisis and stave off political unrest, Reuters has reported. Egypt is counting on top liquid natural gas (LNG) exporter Qatar to obtain additional gas volumes in summer, while encouraging factories to plan their annual maintenance for those months of peak demand, said EGPC chairman, Tarek El Barkatawy. Egypt produces its own energy, but has been a net oil importer since 2008 and is rapidly becoming a net importer of natural gas.

Egypt produced 691,000 bbl/d of oil and 2,141.05 Tcf of natural gas in 2013, making the country the largest non-OPEC producer of oil and the second-largest dry natural gas producer in Africa. In 2013, Egypt was the largest consumer of oil and natural gas in Africa, as more than 20% of total oil consumption and more than 40% of total dry natural gas consumption in Africa. Also, Egypt possesses the largest oil refinery capacity in Africa 726,000 bbl/d (in 2012).

Egypt is currently planning to build its first nuclear power plant in El Dabaa, in the northern part of the country, with $25 billion in Russian financing.

Transport 

Transport in Egypt is centred around Cairo and largely follows the pattern of settlement along the Nile. The main line of the nation's  railway network runs from Alexandria to Aswan and is operated by Egyptian National Railways.

 The Cairo Metro in Egypt is the first of only two full-fledged metro systems in Africa and the Arab World. It is considered one of the most important recent projects in Egypt which cost around 12 billion Egyptian pounds. The system consists of three operational lines with a fourth line expected in the future.

EgyptAir, which is now the country's flag carrier and largest airline, was founded in 1932 by Egyptian industrialist Talaat Harb, today owned by the Egyptian government. The airline is based at Cairo International Airport, its main hub, operating scheduled passenger and freight services to more than 75 destinations in the Middle East, Europe, Africa, Asia, and the Americas. The Current EgyptAir fleet includes 80 aeroplanes.

Suez Canal 

The Suez Canal is an artificial sea-level waterway in Egypt considered the most important centre of the maritime transport in the Middle East, connecting the Mediterranean Sea and the Red Sea. Opened in November 1869 after 10 years of construction work, it allows ship transport between Europe and Asia without navigation around Africa. The northern terminus is Port Said and the southern terminus is Port Tawfiq at the city of Suez. Ismailia lies on its west bank,  from the half-way point.

The canal is a single lane with passing places in the Ballah By-Pass and the Great Bitter Lake. It contains no locks; seawater flows freely through the canal. In general, the canal north of the Bitter Lakes flows north in winter and south in summer. The current south of the lakes changes with the tide at Suez.

On 26 August 2014 a proposal was made for opening a New Suez Canal. Work on the New Suez Canal was completed in July 2015. The channel was officially inaugurated with a ceremony attended by foreign leaders and featuring military flyovers on 6 August 2015, in accordance with the budgets laid out for the project.

Water supply and sanitation 

The piped water supply in Egypt increased between 1990 and 2010 from 89% to 100% in urban areas and from 39% to 93% in rural areas despite rapid population growth. Over that period, Egypt achieved the elimination of open defecation in rural areas and invested in infrastructure. Access to an improved water source in Egypt is now practically universal with a rate of 99%. About one half of the population is connected to sanitary sewers.

Partly because of low sanitation coverage about 17,000 children die each year because of diarrhoea. Another challenge is low cost recovery due to water tariffs that are among the lowest in the world. This in turn requires government subsidies even for operating costs, a situation that has been aggravated by salary increases without tariff increases after the Arab Spring. Poor operation of facilities, such as water and wastewater treatment plants, as well as limited government accountability and transparency, are also issues.

Due to the absence of appreciable rainfall, Egypt's agriculture depends entirely on irrigation. The main source of irrigation water is the river Nile of which the flow is controlled by the high dam at Aswan. It releases, on average, 55 cubic kilometres (45,000,000 acre·ft) water per year, of which some 46 cubic kilometres (37,000,000 acre·ft) are diverted into the irrigation canals.

In the Nile valley and delta, almost 33,600 square kilometres (13,000 sq mi) of land benefit from these irrigation waters producing on average 1.8 crops per year.

Demographics 

Egypt is the most populated country in the Arab world and the third most populous on the African continent, with about 95 million inhabitants . Its population grew rapidly from 1970 to 2010 due to medical advances and increases in agricultural productivity enabled by the Green Revolution. Egypt's population was estimated at 3 million when Napoleon invaded the country in 1798.

Egypt's people are highly urbanised, being concentrated along the Nile (notably Cairo and Alexandria), in the Delta and near the Suez Canal. Egyptians are divided demographically into those who live in the major urban centres and the fellahin, or farmers, that reside in rural villages. The total inhabited area constitutes only 77,041 km², putting the physiological density at over 1,200 people per km2, similar to Bangladesh.

While emigration was restricted under Nasser, thousands of Egyptian professionals were dispatched abroad in the context of the Arab Cold War. Egyptian emigration was liberalised in 1971, under President Sadat, reaching record numbers after the 1973 oil crisis. An estimated 2.7 million Egyptians live abroad. Approximately 70% of Egyptian migrants live in Arab countries (923,600 in Saudi Arabia, 332,600 in Libya, 226,850 in Jordan, 190,550 in Kuwait with the rest elsewhere in the region) and the remaining 30% reside mostly in Europe and North America (318,000 in the United States, 110,000 in Canada and 90,000 in Italy). The process of emigrating to non-Arab states has been ongoing since the 1950s.

Ethnic groups 
Ethnic Egyptians are by far the largest ethnic group in the country, constituting 99.7% of the total population. Ethnic minorities include the Abazas, Turks, Greeks, Bedouin Arab tribes living in the eastern deserts and the Sinai Peninsula, the Berber-speaking Siwis (Amazigh) of the Siwa Oasis, and the Nubian communities clustered along the Nile. There are also tribal Beja communities concentrated in the southeasternmost corner of the country, and a number of Dom clans mostly in the Nile Delta and Faiyum who are progressively becoming assimilated as urbanisation increases.

Some 5 million immigrants live in Egypt, mostly Sudanese, "some of whom have lived in Egypt for generations." Smaller numbers of immigrants come from Iraq, Ethiopia, Somalia, South Sudan, and Eritrea.

The Office of the United Nations High Commissioner for Refugees estimated that the total number of "people of concern" (refugees, asylum seekers, and stateless people) was about 250,000. In 2015, the number of registered Syrian refugees in Egypt was 117,000, a decrease from the previous year. Egyptian government claims that a half-million Syrian refugees live in Egypt are thought to be exaggerated. There are 28,000 registered Sudanese refugees in Egypt.

The once-vibrant and ancient Greek and Jewish communities in Egypt have almost disappeared, with only a small number remaining in the country, but many Egyptian Jews visit on religious or other occasions and tourism. Several important Jewish archaeological and historical sites are found in Cairo, Alexandria and other cities.

Languages 

The official language of the Republic is Literary Arabic. The spoken languages are: Egyptian Arabic (68%), Sa'idi Arabic (29%), Eastern Egyptian Bedawi Arabic (1.6%), Sudanese Arabic (0.6%), Domari (0.3%), Nobiin (0.3%), Beja (0.1%), Siwi and others. Additionally, Greek, Armenian and Italian, and more recently, African languages like Amharic and Tigrigna are the main languages of immigrants.

The main foreign languages taught in schools, by order of popularity, are English, French, German and Italian.

Historically Egyptian was spoken, the latest stage of which is Coptic Egyptian. Spoken Coptic was mostly extinct by the 17th century but may have survived in isolated pockets in Upper Egypt as late as the 19th century. It remains in use as the liturgical language of the Coptic Orthodox Church of Alexandria. It forms a separate branch among the family of Afroasiatic languages.

Religion 

Egypt has the largest Muslim population in the Arab world, and the sixth world's largest Muslim population, and home for (5%) of the world's Muslim population. Egypt also has the largest Christian population in the Middle East and North Africa.

Egypt is a predominantly Sunni Muslim country with Islam as its state religion. The percentage of adherents of various religions is a controversial topic in Egypt. An estimated 85–90% are identified as Muslim, 10–15% as Coptic Christians, and 1% as other Christian denominations, although without a census the numbers cannot be known. Other estimates put the Christian population as high as 15–20%. Non-denominational Muslims form roughly 12% of the population.

Egypt was a Christian country before the 7th century, and after Islam arrived, the country was gradually Islamised into a majority-Muslim country. It is not known when Muslims reached a majority variously estimated from c. 1000 CE to as late as the 14th century. Egypt emerged as a centre of politics and culture in the Muslim world. Under Anwar Sadat, Islam became the official state religion and Sharia the main source of law. It is estimated that 15 million Egyptians follow Native Sufi orders, with the Sufi leadership asserting that the numbers are much greater as many Egyptian Sufis are not officially registered with a Sufi order. At least 305 people were killed during a November 2017 attack on a Sufi mosque in Sinai.

There is also a Shi'a minority. The Jerusalem Center for Public Affairs estimates the Shia population at 1 to 2.2 million and could measure as much as 3 million. The Ahmadiyya population is estimated at less than 50,000, whereas the Salafi (ultra-conservative Sunni) population is estimated at five to six million. Cairo is famous for its numerous mosque minarets and has been dubbed "The City of 1,000 Minarets".

Of the Christian population in Egypt over 90% belong to the native Coptic Orthodox Church of Alexandria, an Oriental Orthodox Christian Church. Other native Egyptian Christians are adherents of the Coptic Catholic Church, the Evangelical Church of Egypt and various other Protestant denominations. Non-native Christian communities are largely found in the urban regions of Cairo and Alexandria, such as the Syro-Lebanese, who belong to Greek Catholic, Greek Orthodox, and Maronite Catholic denominations.

Ethnic Greeks also made up a large Greek Orthodox population in the past. Likewise, Armenians made up the then larger Armenian Orthodox and Catholic communities. Egypt also used to have a large Roman Catholic community, largely made up of Italians and Maltese. These non-native communities were much larger in Egypt before the Nasser regime and the nationalisation that took place.

Egypt hosts the Coptic Orthodox Church of Alexandria. It was founded back in the first century, considered to be the largest church in the country.

Egypt is also the home of Al-Azhar University (founded in 969 CE, began teaching in 975 CE), which is today the world's "most influential voice of establishment Sunni Islam" and is, by some measures, the second-oldest continuously operating university in the world.

Egypt recognises only three religions: Islam, Christianity, and Judaism. Other faiths and minority Muslim sects practised by Egyptians, such as the small Baháʼí Faith and Ahmadiyya communities, are not recognised by the state and face persecution by the government, which labels these groups a threat to Egypt's national security. Individuals, particularly Baháʼís and atheists, wishing to include their religion (or lack thereof) on their mandatory state issued identification cards are denied this ability (see Egyptian identification card controversy), and are put in the position of either not obtaining required identification or lying about their faith. A 2008 court ruling allowed members of unrecognised faiths to obtain identification and leave the religion field blank.

Education 

The illiteracy rate has decreased since 1996 from 39.4 to 25.9 percent in 2013. The adult literacy rate  was estimated at 73.9%. The illiteracy rate is highest among those over 60 years of age being estimated at 64.9%, while illiteracy among youth between 15 and 24 years of age was listed at 8.6 percent.

A European-style education system was first introduced in Egypt by the Ottomans in the early 19th century to nurture a class of loyal bureaucrats and army officers. Under British occupation investment in education was curbed drastically, and secular public schools, which had previously been free, began to charge fees.

In the 1950s, President Nasser phased in free education for all Egyptians. The Egyptian curriculum influenced other Arab education systems, which often employed Egyptian-trained teachers. Demand soon outstripped the level of available state resources, causing the quality of public education to deteriorate. Today this trend has culminated in poor teacher–student ratios (often around one to fifty) and persistent gender inequality.

Basic education, which includes six years of primary and three years of preparatory school, is a right for Egyptian children from the age of six. After grade 9, students are tracked into one of two strands of secondary education: general or technical schools. General secondary education prepares students for further education, and graduates of this track normally join higher education institutes based on the results of the Thanaweya Amma, the leaving exam.

Technical secondary education has two strands, one lasting three years and a more advanced education lasting five. Graduates of these schools may have access to higher education based on their results on the final exam, but this is generally uncommon.

Cairo University is Egypt's premier public university. The country is currently opening new research institutes for the aim of modernising research in the nation, the most recent example of which is Zewail City of Science and Technology. Egypt was ranked 94th in the Global Innovation Index in 2021, down from 92nd in 2019.

Health 

Egyptian life expectancy at birth was 73.20 years in 2011, or 71.30 years for males and 75.20 years for females. Egypt spends 3.7 percent of its gross domestic product on health including treatment costs 22 percent incurred by citizens and the rest by the state. In 2010, spending on healthcare accounted for 4.66% of the country's GDP. In 2009, there were 16.04 physicians and 33.80 nurses per 10,000 inhabitants.

As a result of modernisation efforts over the years, Egypt's healthcare system has made great strides forward. Access to healthcare in both urban and rural areas greatly improved and immunisation programs are now able to cover 98% of the population. Life expectancy increased from 44.8 years during the 1960s to 72.12 years in 2009. There was a noticeable decline of the infant mortality rate (during the 1970s to the 1980s the infant mortality rate was 101–132/1000 live births, in 2000 the rate was 50–60/1000, and in 2008 it was 28–30/1000).

According to the World Health Organization in 2008, an estimated 91.1% of Egypt's girls and women aged 15 to 49 have been subjected to genital mutilation, despite being illegal in the country. In 2016 the law was amended to impose tougher penalties on those convicted of performing the procedure, pegging the highest jail term at 15 years. Those who escort victims to the procedure can also face jail terms up to 3 years.

The total number of Egyptians with health insurance reached 37 million in 2009, of which 11 million are minors, providing an insurance coverage of approximately 52 percent of Egypt's population.

Largest cities

Culture 

Egypt is a recognised cultural trend-setter of the Arabic-speaking world. Contemporary Arabic and Middle-Eastern culture is heavily influenced by Egyptian literature, music, film and television. Egypt gained a regional leadership role during the 1950s and 1960s, giving a further enduring boost to the standing of Egyptian culture in the Arabic-speaking world.

Egyptian identity evolved in the span of a long period of occupation to accommodate Islam, Christianity and Judaism; and a new language, Arabic, and its spoken descendant, Egyptian Arabic which is also based on many Ancient Egyptian words.

The work of early 19th century scholar Rifa'a al-Tahtawi renewed interest in Egyptian antiquity and exposed Egyptian society to Enlightenment principles. Tahtawi co-founded with education reformer Ali Mubarak a native Egyptology school that looked for inspiration to medieval Egyptian scholars, such as Suyuti and Maqrizi, who themselves studied the history, language and antiquities of Egypt.

Egypt's renaissance peaked in the late 19th and early 20th centuries through the work of people like Muhammad Abduh, Ahmed Lutfi el-Sayed, Muhammad Loutfi Goumah, Tawfiq el-Hakim, Louis Awad, Qasim Amin, Salama Moussa, Taha Hussein and Mahmoud Mokhtar. They forged a liberal path for Egypt expressed as a commitment to personal freedom, secularism and faith in science to bring progress.

Arts 

The Egyptians were one of the first major civilisations to codify design elements in art and architecture. Egyptian blue, also known as calcium copper silicate is a pigment used by Egyptians for thousands of years. It is considered to be the first synthetic pigment. The wall paintings done in the service of the Pharaohs followed a rigid code of visual rules and meanings. Egyptian civilisation is renowned for its colossal pyramids, temples and monumental tombs.

Well-known examples are the Pyramid of Djoser designed by ancient architect and engineer Imhotep, the Sphinx, and the temple of Abu Simbel. Modern and contemporary Egyptian art can be as diverse as any works in the world art scene, from the vernacular architecture of Hassan Fathy and Ramses Wissa Wassef, to Mahmoud Mokhtar's sculptures, to the distinctive Coptic iconography of Isaac Fanous. The Cairo Opera House serves as the main performing arts venue in the Egyptian capital.

Literature 

Egyptian literature traces its beginnings to ancient Egypt and is some of the earliest known literature. Indeed, the Egyptians were the first culture to develop literature as we know it today, that is, the book. It is an important cultural element in the life of Egypt. Egyptian novelists and poets were among the first to experiment with modern styles of Arabic literature, and the forms they developed have been widely imitated throughout the Arab world. The first modern Egyptian novel Zaynab by Muhammad Husayn Haykal was published in 1913 in the Egyptian vernacular. Egyptian novelist Naguib Mahfouz was the first Arabic-language writer to win the Nobel Prize in Literature. Egyptian women writers include Nawal El Saadawi, well known for her feminist activism, and Alifa Rifaat who also writes about women and tradition.

Vernacular poetry is perhaps the most popular literary genre among Egyptians, represented by the works of Ahmed Fouad Negm (Fagumi), Salah Jaheen and Abdel Rahman el-Abnudi.

Media 

Egyptian media are highly influential throughout the Arab World, attributed to large audiences and increasing freedom from government control. Freedom of the media is guaranteed in the constitution; however, many laws still restrict this right.

Cinema 

Egyptian cinema became a regional force with the coming of sound. In 1936, Studio Misr, financed by industrialist Talaat Harb, emerged as the leading Egyptian studio, a role the company retained for three decades. For over 100 years, more than 4000 films have been produced in Egypt, three quarters of the total Arab production. Egypt is considered the leading country in the field of cinema in the Arab world. Actors from all over the Arab world seek to appear in the Egyptian cinema for the sake of fame. The Cairo International Film Festival has been rated as one of 11 festivals with a top class rating worldwide by the International Federation of Film Producers' Associations.

The number of cinemas increased with the emergence of talking films, and reached 395 in 1958. This number began to decline after the establishment of television in 1960 and the establishment of the public sector in cinemas in 1962, and reached 297 in 1965, then to 141 in 1995 due to the circulation of films through video equipment though the boom of the film industry in this period. Due to laws and procedures that encouraged investment in the establishment of private cinemas, they increased again, especially in commercial centers, until their number reached 200 in 2001 and 400 in 2009. Over a period of more than a hundred years, Egyptian cinema has presented more than four thousand films.

Music 

Egyptian music is a rich mixture of indigenous, Mediterranean, African and Western elements. It has been an integral part of Egyptian culture since antiquity. The ancient Egyptians credited one of their gods Hathor with the invention of music, which Osiris in turn used as part of his effort to civilise the world. Egyptians used music instruments since then.

Contemporary Egyptian music traces its beginnings to the creative work of people such as Abdu al-Hamuli, Almaz and Mahmoud Osman, who influenced the later work of Sayed Darwish, Umm Kulthum, Mohammed Abdel Wahab and Abdel Halim Hafez whose age is considered the golden age of music in Egypt and the whole Arab world. Prominent contemporary Egyptian pop singers include Amr Diab and Mohamed Mounir.

Dances 

Today, Egypt is often considered the home of belly dance. Egyptian belly dance has two main styles – raqs baladi and raqs sharqi. There are also numerous folkloric and character dances that may be part of an Egyptian-style belly dancer's repertoire, as well as the modern shaabi street dance which shares some elements with raqs baladi.

Museums 

Egypt has one of the oldest civilisations in the world. It has been in contact with many other civilisations and nations and has been through so many eras, starting from prehistoric age to the modern age, passing through so many ages such as; Pharonic, Roman, Greek, Islamic and many other ages. Because of this wide variation of ages, the continuous contact with other nations and the big number of conflicts Egypt had been through, at least 60 museums may be found in Egypt, mainly covering a wide area of these ages and conflicts.

The three main museums in Egypt are The Egyptian Museum which has more than 120,000 items, the Egyptian National Military Museum and the 6th of October Panorama.

The Grand Egyptian Museum (GEM), also known as the Giza Museum, is an under construction museum that will house the largest collection of ancient Egyptian artifacts in the world, it has been described as the world's largest archaeological museum. The Minister of Antiquities Mamdouh al-Damaty announced in May 2015 that the museum will be partially opened in May 2018.

Festivals 
Egypt celebrates many festivals and religious carnivals, also known as mulid. They are usually associated with a particular Coptic or Sufi saint, but are often celebrated by Egyptians irrespective of creed or religion. Ramadan has a special flavour in Egypt, celebrated with sounds, lights (local lanterns known as fawanees) and much flare that many Muslim tourists from the region flock to Egypt to witness during Ramadan.

The ancient spring festival of Sham en Nisim (Coptic:  shom en nisim) has been celebrated by Egyptians for thousands of years, typically between the Egyptian months of Paremoude (April) and Pashons (May), following Easter Sunday.

Cuisine 

Egyptian cuisine is notably conducive to vegetarian diets, as it relies heavily on legume and vegetable dishes. Although food in Alexandria and the coast of Egypt tends to use a great deal of fish and other seafood, for the most part Egyptian cuisine is based on foods that grow out of the ground. Meat has been very expensive for most Egyptians throughout history, so a great number of vegetarian dishes have been developed.

Some consider kushari (a mixture of rice, lentils, and macaroni) to be the national dish. Fried onions can be also added to kushari. In addition, ful medames (mashed fava beans) is one of the most popular dishes. Fava bean is also used in making falafel (also known as "ta'miya"), which may have originated in Egypt and spread to other parts of the Middle East. Garlic fried with coriander is added to molokhiya, a popular green soup made from finely chopped jute leaves, sometimes with chicken or rabbit.

Sports 

Football is the most popular national sport of Egypt. The Cairo Derby is one of the fiercest derbies in Africa, and the BBC picked it as one of the 7 toughest derbies in the world. Al Ahly is the most successful club of the 20th century in the African continent according to CAF, closely followed by their rivals Zamalek SC. They're known as the "African Club of the Century". With twenty titles, Al Ahly is currently the world's most successful club in terms of international trophies, surpassing Italy's A.C. Milan and Argentina's Boca Juniors, both having eighteen.

The Egyptian national football team, known as the Pharaohs, won the African Cup of Nations seven times, including three times in a row in 2006, 2008, and 2010. Considered the most successful African national team and one which has reached the top 10 of the FIFA world rankings, Egypt has qualified for the FIFA World Cup three times. Two goals from star player Mohamed Salah in their last qualifying game took Egypt through to the 2018 FIFA World Cup. The Egyptian Youth National team Young Pharaohs won the Bronze Medal of the 2001 FIFA youth world cup in Argentina. Egypt was 4th place in the football tournament in the 1928 and the 1964 Olympics.

Squash and tennis are other popular sports in Egypt. The Egyptian squash team has been competitive in international championships since the 1930s. Amr Shabana and Ramy Ashour are Egypt's best players and both were ranked the world's number one squash player. Egypt has won the Squash World Championships four times, with the last title being in 2017.

In 1999, Egypt hosted the IHF World Men's Handball Championship, and hosted it again in 2021. In 2001, the national handball team achieved its best result in the tournament by reaching fourth place. Egypt has won in the African Men's Handball Championship five times, being the best team in Africa. In addition to that, it also championed the Mediterranean Games in 2013, the Beach Handball World Championships in 2004 and the Summer Youth Olympics in 2010.
Among all African nations, the Egypt national basketball team holds the record for best performance at the Basketball World Cup and at the Summer Olympics. Further, the team has won a record number of 16 medals at the African Championship.

Egypt has taken part in the Summer Olympic Games since 1912 and has hosted several other international competitions including the first Mediterranean Games in 1951, the 1991 All-Africa Games, the 2009 FIFA U-20 World Cup and the 1953, 1965 and 2007 editions of the Pan Arab Games.

Egypt featured a national team in beach volleyball that competed at the 2018–2020 CAVB Beach Volleyball Continental Cup in both the women's and the men's section.

See also 

 Index of Egypt-related articles
 Outline of ancient Egypt
 Outline of Egypt

Notes

References

External links 

Government
 Egypt Information Portal (Arabic, English)
 Egypt Information and Decision Support Center (Arabic, English)
 Egypt State Information Services (Arabic, English, French)
 Egyptian Tourist Authority

General
 Country Profile from the BBC News
 Egypt. The World Factbook. Central Intelligence Agency.
 Egypt profile from Africa.com
 
 Egypt news 
 
 
 
 
 Egypt Maps – Perry–Castañeda Library Map Collection, University of Texas at Austin

Trade
 World Bank Summary Trade Statistics Egypt

 
North African countries
Western Asian countries
Saharan countries
Arabic-speaking countries and territories
Developing 8 Countries member states
Eastern Mediterranean
G15 nations
Member states of the African Union
Member states of the Arab League
Member states of the Organisation internationale de la Francophonie
Member states of the Organisation of Islamic Cooperation
Member states of the Union for the Mediterranean
Member states of the United Nations
Middle Eastern countries
Near Eastern countries
States and territories established in 1922
1922 establishments in Egypt
1922 establishments in Africa
1922 establishments in Asia
Countries in Africa
Countries in Asia
Transcontinental countries
Arab republics